The Association des Radioamateurs du Kayldall (ADRAD) is a local non-profit organization for amateur radio enthusiasts in Luxembourg. The ADRAD was founded on March 30, 1979.

The ADRAD operates several radio repeaters on its own repeater-site, operates radio beacons on UHF and SHF, organizes regular ham-meetings, issues an amateur radio award and hosts a club-shop. In 2014 the ADRAD organised the first European DMR contest on UHF. Members of the ADRAD take part in worldwide amateur radio contests.

Amateur radio repeaters operated by the ADRAD 
 the ADRAD operates 2 voice repeaters

Amateur radio beacons operated by the ADRAD 

As of 2016 the ADRAD operates 2 radio beacons on UHF and SHF
.

References 

Amateur radio organizations
Clubs and societies in Luxembourg
Radio in Luxembourg